Hassanpour is a surname. Notable people with the surname include:

Amir Hassanpour (1943–2017), Iranian Kurdish scholar
Ardeshir Hassanpour (1962–2007), Iranian physics and electrical scientist